MTV Unplugged No. 2.0 is a live album by American singer and rapper Lauryn Hill. The performance comes from her 2002 MTV Unplugged special recorded on July 21, 2001 at MTV Studios in Times Square, New York City. Hill abandoned the hip hop sounds of her debut album The Miseducation of Lauryn Hill (1998) in favor of folk and soul songs she performed with an acoustic guitar. The songs were interspersed with spoken interludes about her personal and artistic struggles.

MTV Unplugged No. 2.0 was met with mixed reviews. Most critics found Hill's performances self-indulgent and repetitive, while some appreciated the album as a bold and sincere change in artistic direction. The album has since received retrospective acclaim by critics who have praised the album for its uniqueness and rawness, and a variety of hip hop, R&B and pop artists have cited it as an inspiration.

The album sold approximately 122,000 copies in its first week, debuting at number three on the Billboard 200. It has been certified platinum by the Recording Industry Association of America, having shipped one million copies in the United States. The song "Mystery of Iniquity" received a Grammy Award nomination for Best Female Rap Solo Performance, and was famously sampled by Kanye West on his 2004 song "All Falls Down".

Music and lyrics
For MTV Unplugged No. 2.0, Hill departed from the hip hop sounds of her debut album The Miseducation of Lauryn Hill (1998) in favor of austerely performed acoustic soul and folk-based songs. She jokingly described herself as a "hip-hop folk singer", and according to Robert Hilburn, assumed the role of a folk singer accompanied only by her acoustic guitar. Rather than singing any of her previous hits, Hill debuted all new songs in a folk style and, in between songs, spoke at length about her personal and artistic struggles.

Release and reception

MTV Unplugged No. 2.0 was released to mixed reviews and modest sales. It debuted and peaked at number three on the Billboard 200, where it charted for fourteen weeks. The album was certified Platinum by RIAA, a month after its release. Most critics questioned Hill's discipline as an artist on the album. In Entertainment Weekly, David Browne said it was "perhaps the most bizarre follow-up in the history of [popular music]", appreciating some of the music's "poetic flow" but finding it exhausting to hear Hill's "strummed sermons directed at unspecified enemies and soul crushers". Alexis Petridis panned the record as "messy" and "inconsequential", mostly because of what he felt were her clichéd self-help lyrics and self-indulgent monologues: "A scant handful of powerful moments, including a furious meditation on the police shooting of a young black man, 'I Find It Hard to Say (Rebel)', are outweighed by repetitious rambling." In The Village Voice, Robert Christgau called it one of the "worst album[s] ever released by an artist of substance", finding the songs overlong, verbose, and unmelodic. Christgau was also critical of Hill's singing voice, calling it typically poor, and of "a solo guitar [she] can barely strum (the first finger-picked figure occurs on track 10, where it repeats dozens upon dozens of times, arghh)."

Some critics appreciated MTV Unplugged No. 2.0 as a radical and bold change in direction by Hill. In a positive review, AllMusic's William Ruhlmann conceded that Hill's spoken interludes sounded vain and foolish but still felt the album was "fascinating" as an "unfinished, unflinching presentation of ideas and of a person". Q was more enthusiastic, finding her songs beautifully sincere and performed austerely in a way that recalled the vibrant quality of Bob Marley's "Redemption Song" (1980).

"Mystery of Iniquity" was nominated at the 45th Grammy Awards for Best Female Rap Solo Performance.

Legacy

Critical reappraisal 
Over time many critics have reevaluated MTV Unplugged No. 2.0, which has gained more acclaim and positive reviews. In a retrospective review for Albumism, Daryl McIntosh wrote "MTV Unplugged No. 2.0 is one of the most unique albums ever captured on tape. One that points straight into the soul of this once-in-a-lifetime artist in raw form, exposing both the brilliance that we fell in love with when we first heard her voice and the fragility of the human spirit."

Katy Iandoli of Revolt praised the album's socially driven material, stating that the songs "I Get Out" and "Mr. Intentional" are now the constructs of modern-day thinkpieces rooted in self-empowerment and "letting go", while referring to the album as "ahead of its time". Journalist Andy Greene of Rolling Stone commended the album, calling it "the most unique, unpolished Unplugged ever to see the light of day", placing it on his list of the 15 best episodes from the MTV Unplugged series.

The New York Times hailed the album as a "classic performance", with journalist Noel Murray referring to it as a "mesmerizing look at a pop star who dared to reinvent herself in public" and comparing it to the work of Nina Simone. In 2022, TheGrio named it among the ten albums that they deemed "ahead of their time", while music critic Matthew Allen wrote that "Twenty years later, it remains a polarizing release for Hill, but fans have come to respect and embrace the bravery and pure artistry of this project". Writing for America, Stephen G. Adubato wrote "Despite its mixed reception at the time, today the album leaves listeners with questions and provocations that are just as relevant as they were 20 years ago, if not more so. Hill's ability to wrestle with the realities of original sin and grace—as they apply to both her own life and the institutions that hold power in our society today—echo the prophetic sensibilities of the greatest religious figures and musical artists" for the album's 20th anniversary.

Influence and impact 
Songs from MTV Unplugged No. 2.0 have been sampled and interpolated by Kanye West on "All Falls Down", ASAP Rocky with Frank Ocean on "Purity" from his album Testing, Ocean with Jazmine Sullivan on the song "Rushes" from his visual album Endless, and Wu-Tang Clan member Method Man on his lead single "Say" from his fourth solo album 4:21 ...The Day After.

Many artists have cited their admiration for the album along with Britney Spears, who referred to the album as "amazing"; Academy-Award nominated singer Celeste, Ella Mai, and Solange Knowles, who listed it as one of the inspirations for her critically acclaimed album A Seat at the Table. Adele has stated her love for the album on many occasions. While singer Sam Smith tweeted that MTV Unplugged No. 2.0 is their "Bible".

Musician Sinéad Harnett revealed to Rated R&B that she has been influenced by the album, while expressing that it "was one of the first times R&B music hit me deeply". Furthermore, Actress America Ferrera wrote in her book American Like Me: Reflections on Life Between Cultures that the album helped her accept her African ethnicity. According to music executive JB Marshall, the album was a major influence on Kanye West's debut album The College Dropout. Marshall told Billboard "That album [MTV Unplugged No. 2.0] was like the Bible".

Many publications such as Pitchfork, have listed Hill's use of the nylon-string classical guitar during the album as one of the prime highlights of the instrument being used throughout history. In an interview with Billboard, rapper B.o.B cited Hill's guitar playing as inspiration for his career, telling them "Lauryn Hill was a huge influence to my guitar playing, her whole Unplugged DVD that she did… I mean, it just changed my life. It kind of gave me the inspiration to keep going, [to] invest a lot more time into the music and not the stuff that doesn’t matter." Singer Lianne La Havas also noted the album and Hill's use of the guitar as an inspiration stating "[I was inspired by] Lauryn Hill’s MTV Unplugged. I already loved The Miseducation… and the Fugees, and finding out that she played guitar was mind-blowing."

Accolades 
The Boombox placed MTV Unplugged No. 2.0 on their '10 Underrated Sophomore Rap Albums From the '90s' list. The album has appeared on many publications list of the best and most memorable MTV unplugged performances, including list by Blavity, BBC, and UDiscover Music. Yardbarker named the album among the twenty recordings they consider to be the best live R&B and hip hop albums; while DJBooth ranked it third on their list of "10 Best Live Hip-Hop Albums". It is considered to be the boldest career move by a female artist, and the ninth overall in rock history by Rolling Stone.

Track listing

Notes
 "So Much Things to Say" is a cover of the Bob Marley and the Wailers song of the same name

Personnel
Lauryn Hill – acoustic guitar, vocals, production
Julian Alexander – art direction
Adam Blackburn – recording, mixing
Alex Coletti – mixing, editing, film production on video broadcast
Joe DeMaio – direction on video broadcast
Max Feldman – recording assistance
Scott Gries – photography
Christopher Koch – audio post-editing technician
Mel Papaterpou – guitar technician
Sue Pelino – audio post-mixing technician
Herb Powers Jr. – mastering
Van Toffler – executive production on video broadcast

Charts

Weekly charts

Year-end charts

Certifications

References

External links
 MTV Unplugged No. 2.0 at Discogs
 Official MTV Unplugged 2.0 Lyrics

Lauryn Hill albums
MTV Unplugged albums
2002 live albums
Columbia Records live albums
Live soul albums
Folk albums by American artists
Albums produced by Lauryn Hill
Live folk albums
Live hip hop albums